Keith Gillhouley (8 August 1934, Crosland Moor, Huddersfield) is a former English first-class cricketer, who played in 24 matches for Yorkshire County Cricket Club in 1961, 83 for Nottinghamshire from 1963 to 1966, and one for Marylebone Cricket Club (MCC) in 1963.

A slow left arm bowler, he was a success with Yorkshire in his debut season of 1961, taking 77 wickets at 22.10, with his career best analysis of 7 for 82 against Middlesex.

He was almost as prolific in his first season at Trent Bridge, taking 74 wickets at 27.82, with a best of 6 for 95.  After that his career went into a decline, with 28 wickets at 30.78 in 1965, and only 10 at 57.90 in his final year for Notts. In all first-class cricket, he took 255 wickets in 108 first-class matches, at an average of 27.14.  He took 5 wickets in an innings eight times.  Batting right-handed, he also scored 2,051 first-class runs at 14.86, with a best of 75 not out against Worcestershire.

Gillhouley played two one day games for Nottinghamshire in the Gillette Cup, taking four wickets at 19.33, all in one spell against his native Yorkshire.

References

External links
Cricinfo Profile

1934 births
Yorkshire cricketers
Nottinghamshire cricketers
Cricketers from Huddersfield
Living people
Marylebone Cricket Club cricketers
English cricketers
English cricketers of 1946 to 1968